The Dominica Premier League is the top division for association football in Dominica, it was created in 1970.
Eight teams participate in this league. Starting in 2005, the winner and runners-up can qualify  for the CONCACAF Champions Cup from the first round of the CFU Club Championship.
The teams play an 18-matches league (home and away matches against the other 9 teams), in the end of that 18 matches the winner is declared the Dominica Champion and the 10th placed is relegated to Dominica First Division.

Some matches are played at 12,000 capacity Windsor Park, which is also used for cricket.

Clubs competing in the 2019–20 season

Bath Estate (Roseau)
Dublanc FC (Dublanc)
East Central (Mahaut)
Exodus (Saint Joseph)
Harlem United (Newtown)
Mahaut (Mahaut)
Portsmouth Bombers (Portsmouth)
Pointe Michel (Pointe Michel)
South East (La Plaine)
WE United (Castle Bruce)

Previous winners
Winners so far: 

1965 : Spartans Sports Club (Laudat)
1966 : Domfruit Rovers (Newtown)
1967 : Domfruit Rovers (Newtown)
1968 : unknown champion
1969 : Spartans Sports Club (Laudat)
1970 : Harlem Rovers (Newtown)
1971 : unknown champion
1972 : Harlem Rovers (Newtown)
1973 : Harlem Rovers (Newtown)
1974 : Harlem Rovers (Newtown)
1975 : not played
1976 : Kensborough United (Roseau)
1977 : Kensborough United (Roseau)
1978 : Kensborough United (Roseau)
1979 : Spartans Sports Club (Laudat)
1980 : unknown champion
1981 : Harlem Bombers (Newtown)
1982 : unknown champion
1983 : Harlem Bombers (Newtown)
1984 : unknown champion
1985 : Antilles Kensborough (Roseau) & Harlem Bombers (Newtown) (shared)
1986–88 : unknown champions
1989 : Harlem Bombers (Newtown)
1990 : unknown champion
Champions in the inaugural Dominica Premier League was won by C&M Motors Potters (Roseau)
1992 : Harlem Bombers (Newtown)
1993 : Harlem Bombers (Newtown)
1994 : Harlem Bombers (Newtown)
1995 : Harlem Bombers (Newtown)
1996 : Black Rocks (Roseau)
1997 : Harlem Bombers (Newtown)
1998 : ACS Zebbians (Goodwill)
1999 : Harlem Bombers (Newtown)
2000 : Harlem Bombers (Newtown)
2001 : Harlem Bombers (Newtown)
2002 : Kubuli All Stars (Saint Joseph)
2003 : Harlem United (Newtown)
2004 : Harlem United (Newtown)
2005 : Dublanc Strikers (Dublanc)
2006 : Harlem United (Newtown)
2007 : Sagicor South East United (La Plaine)
2008 : Centre Bath Estate (Roseau)
2009 : Centre Bath Estate (Roseau)
2010 : Centre Bath Estate (Roseau)
2011–12 : Harlem United (Newtown)
2012–13 : Centre Bath Estate (Roseau)
2013–14 : Northern Bombers (Portsmouth)
2014–15 : Exodus (Saint Joseph)
2015–16 : Dublanc (Dublanc)
2016–17 : Dublanc (Dublanc)
2017–18 : abandoned
2018–19 : South East (La Plaine)
2020 : South East (La Plaine)
2021 : abandoned

References

Football leagues in Dominica
Top level football leagues in the Caribbean
Sports leagues established in 1970
1970 establishments in Dominica

ro:Primera División de Republica Dominicana